Leonora Wray MBE (2 July 1886 – 4 April 1979) was an Australian golfer, often referred to as the "mother" of Australian golf. Wray won the Australian Women's Amateur in 1907, 1908 and 1929 and the New South Wales Women's Amateur Championship in 1906, 1907, 1908 and 1930. She helped establish the Tasman Cup competition with New Zealand.

References

1886 births
1979 deaths
Sportswomen from New South Wales
Australian female golfers
Golfers from Sydney
Sport Australia Hall of Fame inductees